Alcanta International College (AIC) is an international school in Baiyun District, Guangzhou.

It offers an International Baccalaureate to students aged 14 to 17, including Mainland Chinese and international students, with a maximum class size of 17.

References

External links
 Alcanta International College
 Alcanta International College 

International schools in Guangzhou
International Baccalaureate schools in China